Shepherd's beaked whale (Tasmacetus shepherdi), also commonly called Tasman's beaked whale or simply the Tasman whale, is a cetacean of the family Ziphiidae and the only species in the genus Tasmacetus. The whale has not been studied extensively. Only four confirmed at sea sightings have been made and 42 strandings recorded (as of 2006). It was first known to science in 1937, being named by W. R. B. Oliver after George Shepherd, curator of the Wanganui Museum, who collected the type specimen near Ohawe on the south Taranaki coast of New Zealand's North Island, in 1933.

Description
They are robust and large-bodied for beaked whales, having a bluff melon and a long, dolphin-like beak. It is the only species of ziphiid with a full set of functional teeth (17 to 27 pairs in both the upper and lower jaws). Adult males also have a pair of tusks at the tip of the lower jaw. They are dark brown dorsally and cream-colored ventrally, with a pale band extending up from the flipper and another pale area extending as a swathe on the posterior flank. The tall, falcate dorsal fin is set about two-thirds the way along the back.

Population and distribution
Sightings and stranding records indicate that the species has a circumpolar distribution in southern hemisphere. No population estimates exist for Shepherd's beaked whale. As of 2006, there have been about 42 stranding records of the species from New Zealand (including the Chatham Islands, 24), Argentina (7), Tristan da Cunha (6), Australia (3), and the Juan Fernández Islands (2). The northernmost record was at Shark Bay in Western Australia in 2008. There have been five unconfirmed sightings (mostly from New Zealand), as well as a "probable" sighting near Shag Rocks and four confirmed sightings—the first two confirmed sightings occurred in 1985, within a few minutes of each other, off the Tristan da Cunha group (first sighting at ); the third in 2002 near Gough Island; and the fourth in 2004 south of Tasmania. In January 2012, a group of up to a dozen of this species were photographed and filmed by the Australian Antarctic Division south of Portland, Victoria. 

Multiple sightings of the species have been reported from Otago submarine canyons off Otago coast, New Zealand. Sightings have been recorded throughout the year with vocalization recordings, suggesting regular presences there. These include at least two sightings in 2016 which were the first confirmed sightings within New Zealand waters, followed by four sightings in 2017, one or more sighting(s) in 2018, one sighting in 2019, four or five sightings in 2021, five sightings in 2022 including a pod of 15-20 animals.

There have been additional sightings from other parts of New Zealand, such as off Gisborne, several sightings off Kaikoura, off Fiordland, Taranaki, and so on.

Behaviour
The animals surfaced several times, before arching to dive. Some were observed to come to the surface at a steep angle like many other ziphiids, raising their head and beaks out of the water. The Shepherd's beaked whale's blow could be observed with the naked eye at a distance of up to 1,000 metres, within a bushy plume that is relatively tall for a ziphiid varying from 1 to 2 metres in height 

The species is seldom seen because of its deep, offshore distribution in waters where sighting conditions can be difficult (the "Roaring Forties" and "Furious Fifties").

Research done on a stranded individual's stomach has indicated that Shepherd's beaked whales eat both fish and squid, as opposed to most beaked whales which only eat cephalopods.

Conservation
There are no reports of this species being hunted or killed accidentally by humans. Shepherd's beaked whale is covered by the Memorandum of Understanding for the Conservation of Cetaceans and Their Habitats in the Pacific Islands Region (Pacific Cetaceans MOU).

Taxonomy
Its nearest relative, the only other living member of the subfamily Ziphiinae, is Cuvier's beaked whale (Ziphius cavirostris).

See also
List of cetaceans

References

Sources
Shepherd's beaked whale in the Encyclopedia of Marine Mammals Thomas A. Jefferson, 1998. 
Whales, Dolphins and Porpoises Carwardine, 1995. 

Cetaceans of the Pacific Ocean
Mammals of Argentina
Mammals of Chile
Ziphiids
Mammals described in 1937